Amar Osim (born 18 July 1967) is a Bosnian professional football manager and former player. He is regarded as one of the most successful Bosnian football managers.

Osim was a talented player during his teens. However, he did not transfer his talent after getting called up to the Željezničar first team. Apart from Željezničar, Osim also played in France for Saint-Dié and Strasbourg. He ended his career while at Željezničar in 1997.

Osim decided to stay in football, becoming a manager. He is the most successful manager in Željezničar's history, winning five Bosnian Premier League titles, four Bosnian cups and one, now defunct, Bosnian Supercup in his three stints with the club. Osim also won one J.League Cup with Japanese club JEF United Chiba in 2006. He managed Qatari club Al Kharaitiyat as well, with mediocre results. In 2022, Osim was appointed at Velež Mostar.

Playing career
Born and raised in Sarajevo, Osim started playing football in hometown club Željezničar. After playing for the youth team, he entered the senior squad in 1986. In 1991, he left for France where he played for lower division clubs Saint-Dié and Strasbourg. In 1996, he returned to his home country. Osim played one more season for Željezničar before retiring.

Although a talented player, with good technical skills, Amar never managed to match the success or renown of his father, Ivica Osim's playing career.

Managerial career

Željezničar
Osim's managerial career started in Željezničar's youth squad which he guided to success in domestic competitions. After Dino Đurbuzović was sacked in the spring of 2001, club officials promoted him to the place of first team manager.

He immediately led the club to two Bosnian Premier League titles in 2001 and in 2002, being runner-up in 2003.

In August 2002, Osim led Željezničar to the 2002–03 UEFA Champions League third qualifying round, where the club lost 5–0 on aggregate to English Premier League club Newcastle United. That is, so far, the club's best post-war European competition result.

He also claimed two national cup titles in 2001 and 2003, being runner-up in 2002. Osim claimed the Bosnian Supercup in 2001 as well, after winning the double that year. In 2002, he got the award for Bosnia and Herzegovina Manager of the Year.

Osim was sacked at the beginning of the 2003–04 season due to poor results.

JEF United Chiba
Amar's father Ivica Osim invited him to Japan to be his assistant at JEF United Chiba. After Ivica  was named the head coach of the Japan national team, Amar got promoted.

He guided JEF United to win the J.League Cup in 2006. But after a poor finish to the 2007 season, in which JEF United finished in 13th place in the J1 League, Osim got sacked.

Return to Željezničar

After his time in Japan, Osim returned to his hometown and in June 2009, returned to Željezničar for his second spell as the club's manager.

In his first season as manager, Osim immediately guided the club to win the league title and finished as national cup runners-up. In the following season he won the national cup, losing the league title just one round before the end of the season and ending third. In 2012, he claimed the league title once again, with three rounds left to play, breaking many records on the way and also defended the national cup, bringing the double back to Željezničar after eleven years.

Osim left the managerial position of the club in September 2013, becoming its new sporting director. In December 2014, he resigned as sporting director and left Željezničar.

While at the club, Osim won many individual managerial awards after his success with Željezničar. In 2010, he won the Bosnian Premier League Manager of the Year award. In 2012, Osim won the 2011–12 Bosnian Premier League Manager of the Season award and the 2012 Manager of the Year award, while in 2013 he won the best in the season award for the 2012–13 season.

Al Kharaitiyat
In December 2014, Osim was named the new manager of Qatar Stars League club Al Kharaitiyat.

In his first season, he made a club record of a seven-game unbeaten run in the league and nine games in all competitions. In that season's league, Al Kharaitiyat finished in 9th place. In March 2015, Osim was named Qatar Stars League Manager of the Month for February 2015.

In his second season as the club's manager, Osim's Al Kharaitiyat finished in 12th place, just narrowly missing relegation.

In November 2016, after a poor start to the 2016–17 season, Osim was sacked after almost two years as Al Kharaitiyat's manager.

Second return to Željezničar

2018–19 season
On 31 December 2018, Osim once again came back to Željezničar and signed a three and a half year contract after monthly speculations of him becoming the manager even earlier.

His first win in his third term as Željezničar's manager came on 3 March 2019, in a 2–1 home league win against Mladost Doboj Kakanj. In Osim's first Sarajevo derby after six years, Željezničar suffered a 3–0 home loss to fierce city rivals FK Sarajevo on 6 April 2019.

On 13 April, in a 1–0 away league loss against Zrinjski Mostar, Osim made his 300th appearance as Željezničar's manager and became the club's third manager with the most games. At the time, the first two were Milan Ribar with 367 games and his father Ivica Osim with 301 games. On 24 April, in his 302nd managerial appearance for Željezničar, in which the club drew 0–0 against Široki Brijeg on their home stadium Grbavica, Amar surpassed his father Ivica and became the second manager with the most appearances in Željezničar's history.

In the last game of the season, Željezničar beat Tuzla City 3–0 away on 25 May 2019, putting an end to a very turbulent season.

2019–20 season
Osim's first win as Željezničar's manager in the 2019–20 season came on 27 July 2019, a 2–0 away league win against Mladost Doboj Kakanj. Željezničar won their first Sarajevo derby since Osim's second return in a 5–2 home league win against Sarajevo on 31 August 2019.

He made a new Bosnian Premier League record with the club on 28 September 2019, after a 2–2 away league draw against Tuzla City, in which Željezničar ended the game unbeaten and continued their 11-game unbeaten run in the league since the beginning of the season, surpassing the one of city rival Sarajevo, which was a ten league game unbeaten run since the start of the 2006–07 Bosnian Premier League season.

On 6 October 2019, Osim's team lost 3–0 away in a league match against Borac Banja Luka, thus ending their 11-game unbeaten run in the league. On 30 November 2019, Željezničar once again beat their rivals Sarajevo, this time in a 3–1 away league win, with Osim being praised from Željezničar fans for his tactical geniusness. In that game, he also earned a yellow card for arguing with referee Haris Kaljanac.

At the end of the season however, Željezničar failed to win any trophy, with Osim's team finishing in 2nd place in the 2019–20 league season, three points short of 1st placed Sarajevo, though after the season ended abruptly due to the COVID-19 pandemic in Bosnia and Herzegovina on 1 June 2020. He also guided the team to the semi-finals of the 2019–20 Bosnian Cup, but did not get the chance to win the competition as it was abandoned due to the pandemic, with no winner being proclaimed.

2020–21 season
Željezničar started off the 2020–21 season with a win against Velež Mostar on 1 August 2020, with Osim's team scoring three goals in the first thirty minutes of the game and securing the win at home ground. That game also marked Osim's 200th win as Željezničar manager. With three more league wins after the Velež game, Željezničar suffered its first loss under Osim in the new season on 21 August 2020, an unexpected 1–0 home defeat against Mladost Doboj Kakanj.

In Osim's first European game with Željezničar since his return, his team lost 3–1 against Israeli club Maccabi Haifa in the 2020–21 UEFA Europa League first qualifying round on 9 September 2020.

In the middle of an eight game winless run in the 2020–21 league season, which had culminated with a home draw against Mladost Doboj Kakanj, Osim was sacked by the club on 11 April 2021.

Velež Mostar
On 11 June 2022, Osim signed a one-year contract with Velež Mostar, with an option to stay at the club even longer. On 15 July 2022, he took charge for the first time as Velež manager for their Premier League match against Posušje, which ended in a 1–1 draw.

On 28 July, Velež unexpectedly got eliminated from the 2022–23 UEFA Europa Conference League in the second qualifying round by Maltese club Ħamrun Spartans. On 5 August 2022, Osim won his first match as Velež manager after a 3–1 win over his former club Željezničar.

Osim terminated his contract with Velež by mutual consent on 29 November 2022.

Personal life
Osim's father Ivica was a renowned player and manager. His mothers' name is Asima. He has two children and one grandchild. On 1 May 2022, Osim's father died in Graz, Austria, where he had mostly lived since 1994. He was buried in Sarajevo at the Bare Cemetery on 14 May, thirteen days after his death.

Managerial statistics

Honours

Manager
Željezničar 
Bosnian Premier League: 2000–01, 2001–02, 2009–10, 2011–12, 2012–13
Bosnian Cup: 2000–01, 2002–03, 2010–11, 2011–12
Bosnian Supercup: 2001

JEF United Chiba 
J.League Cup: 2006

Individual
Bosnia and Herzegovina Manager of the Year: 2002, 2012
Bosnian Premier League Manager of the Year/Season: 2010, 2011–12, 2012–13
Qatar Stars League Manager of the Month: February 2015

See also
List of FK Željezničar Sarajevo players 
List of FK Željezničar Sarajevo managers

References

External links

Amar Osim at Soccerway

1967 births
Living people
Footballers from Sarajevo
Yugoslav footballers
Bosnia and Herzegovina footballers
Yugoslav expatriate footballers
Bosnia and Herzegovina expatriate footballers
Expatriate footballers in France
Yugoslav expatriate sportspeople in France
Bosnia and Herzegovina expatriate sportspeople in France
Yugoslav First League players
FK Željezničar Sarajevo players
SR Saint-Dié players
ASPV Strasbourg players
Association football midfielders
Bosnia and Herzegovina football managers
Bosnia and Herzegovina expatriate football managers
Expatriate football managers in Japan
Expatriate football managers in Qatar
Bosnia and Herzegovina expatriate sportspeople in Japan
Bosnia and Herzegovina expatriate sportspeople in Qatar
Premier League of Bosnia and Herzegovina managers
J1 League managers
Qatar Stars League managers
FK Željezničar Sarajevo managers
JEF United Chiba managers
Al Kharaitiyat SC managers
FK Velež Mostar managers
Bosnia and Herzegovina people of Bosniak descent
Bosnia and Herzegovina people of Slovenian descent 
Bosnia and Herzegovina people of German descent 
Bosnia and Herzegovina people of Polish descent 
Bosnia and Herzegovina people of Czech descent